Peace Sells... but Who's Buying? is the second studio album by American thrash metal band Megadeth, released on September 19, 1986, through Capitol Records. The project was originally handled by Combat Records, resulting in the original mix of the album being co-produced by Randy Burns. Capitol Records then bought the rights to the album and hired another producer named Paul Lani to mix it himself. The recording of the album was difficult for the band, because of the ongoing drug issues the members had at the time. Drummer Gar Samuelson and guitarist Chris Poland were fired shortly after the album's promotional tour for drug abuse, making Peace Sells Samuelson's last Megadeth album. Poland would eventually reappear as a session musician on The System Has Failed 18 years later. The title track, noted for its politically conscious lyrics, was released as the album's second single, but the band's first music video. The album's cover art, featuring the band's mascot Vic Rattlehead in front of a desolated United Nations Headquarters, was created by Ed Repka.

Peace Sells... but Who's Buying? is often regarded as a thrash metal classic and as an album that gave prominence to extreme metal. It has been featured in several publications' best album lists, including Robert Dimery's 1001 Albums You Must Hear Before You Die and Martin Popoff's Top 500 Heavy Metal Albums of All Time. The album has been reissued several times over the years. In 2004, the album was remixed and remastered by Megadeth frontman Dave Mustaine, with extensive liner notes detailing the album's background. In 2011, the three different versions were reissued as part of the album's 25th anniversary celebration. All of them with the exception of the 2004 mixes feature new remastering.

Background and recording 
In an interview for Metal Forces in December 1985, frontman Dave Mustaine revealed that the band had already started writing new material for the second album. He said that two songs ("Black Friday" and "Bad Omen") were finished and described them as a "total blur", being much faster than "Rattlehead" from their debut album, Killing Is My Business... and Business Is Good! Speaking about the lyrical content of Peace Sells..., Mustaine and bassist David Ellefson stated that they wanted to change the public perception of heavy metal by writing songs that contained socially aware lyrics. Mustaine further noted that the band was not unaware of the political situation at the time, and that some of his political beliefs were reflected in the songs. Professional rock critic Steve Huey noted the album's combination of "punkish political awareness with a dark, threatening, typically heavy metal worldview".

During the first two months of 1986, Megadeth commenced a brief tour of the East Coast of the United States. At the shows, which were practically a continuation of the Killing for a Living tour, the band performed a number of songs from its upcoming album. Following the conclusion of the tour, the band intended to start making the record at the Music Grinder studio on Melrose Avenue in Hollywood. Mustaine lifted the title from an article in Reader's Digest, which was titled "Peace Would Sell But No One Would Buy It". Their label at the time, Combat Records, provided a recording budget of $25,000, which allowed the band to hire a freelance producer, Randy Burns. The recording of the album turned out to be very difficult for the band, because Mustaine and Ellefson were both homeless at the time. Furthermore, guitarist Chris Poland and drummer Gar Samuelson would not show up for hours because of their heroin addiction. Shortly after the band finished the final recordings of the album for Combat, they were approached by Tim Carr, an A&R representative of Capitol Records. After securing a contract with the group, Capitol hired producer Paul Lani to remix the original mixes done by Randy Burns, the previous producer.

Poland was the only member who had multiple instruments, as Ellefson and Mustaine only had one bass and guitar respectively. Unlike Mustaine's previous band, both he and Poland laid down lead and rhythm tracks.

Songs

Tracks 1–4
"Wake Up Dead" features lyrics which describe a man who has been cheating on his wife or girlfriend and is sneaking into his house, knowing that if his wife finds out about his other lover, she will kill him. Mustaine said that "Wake Up Dead" was written about him cheating on a girl with whom he was living. He stayed with her because he was homeless at the time and needed a place to stay. Unfortunately, he was in love with another girl and thought the one he lived with would be mad because he was cheating on her. He had to leave her because he thought she had intentions to kill him. "The Conjuring", according to author Bob Larson, simulates a Satanic ceremony, and makes references about being the devil's advocate and his salesman. Mustaine explained the song is about black magic and contains instructions for hexes. However, because the subject matter appears incompatible to his conversion to Christianity, the song had not been played live since 2001, until June 12, 2018, when Megadeth performed "The Conjuring" live for the first time in 17 years at the Home Monitoring Aréna in Plzeň, Czech Republic.

"Peace Sells" reflects Mustaine's political and social beliefs. The lyrics are a disapproval of the American way and convey Mustaine's wish for a new social structure. Ellefson has stated that during the tour prior to recording the album, the band could tell then that the song was going to be a hit. The video for the title track became an MTV mainstay and the opening bass line was used as introduction to MTV News. However, Mustaine proclaimed that they received no royalties because the song was excluded shortly before MTV would have to pay them for its use. "Devils Island" is a reference to a former French penal colony off the coast of French Guiana. The lyrics detail the thoughts of a condemned prisoner awaiting execution. He is spared by God, but must spend the rest of his life on the island.

Tracks 5–8
"Good Mourning/Black Friday" is a two-piece song, which begins with an instrumental section called "Good Mourning". Lyrically, Mustaine has described "Black Friday" as being about "a homicidal madman who goes on a killing spree". With an excessive use of gory language and violent imagery, the song chronicles the acts of a serial killer. It was inspired by Dijon Carruthers, who was briefly the band's drummer prior to the hiring of Gar Samuelson. According to Mustaine, Carruthers was hanging out with people who were practicing occultism, and they inspired him to write songs based on spiritual themes.

"Bad Omen" explores the theme of occultism. Mustaine described "Bad Omen" like "two happy campers who have stumbled onto a Satanic orgy in the middle of the woods" and then "they see these fools waiting around for Satan's blessing". Asked whether the band members really believe in the subject matters they write, Mustaine responded: "We're aware of the subjects we write about—witchcraft, Satanic sacrifices and the like—but we're not condoning them." "I Ain't Superstitious" was written by Willie Dixon and originally recorded by Howlin' Wolf in 1961. However, Megadeth's version is vastly different from the original. "My Last Words" is about a game of Russian roulette and the fear one goes through when playing the game. Despite being one of the lesser known tracks on the record, music journalist Martin Popoff said that the song was an example of the band's "fast thrashers" and an evidence why Megadeth were dubbed as the "fearless speed progenitors". Lars Ulrich, founding member of Metallica and former bandmate of Mustaine, has stated that "My Last Words" is his favorite Megadeth song.

Release and promotion
Peace Sells... but Who's Buying? was released on September 19, 1986. The album's artwork was designed by Ed Repka, who would go on to do several other pieces of artwork for the band. The cover art depicts the band's mascot, Vic Rattlehead, in front of a ruined United Nations Headquarters. He is portrayed as a real estate agent, who is selling the devastated remains of the organization's headquarters. Repka considers the art cover to be a "significant milestone" in his career.

The title track was released as a single, for which the band filmed its first video. In 1987, a video was made for the lead single, "Wake Up Dead", which exposed the band performing in a steel cage. Soon after the album's release, Megadeth began a tour as a supporting band for Motörhead. The tour took place in California and the southwestern parts of the United States. However, due to disagreements between the managements of the two bands, Megadeth were pulled from the last three shows. Following the short stint with Motörhead, Megadeth were added as the opening act on Alice Cooper's Constrictor tour, which took place at the beginning of 1987. Later in 1987, after the conclusion of the album's promotional tour, Mustaine fired Poland and Samuelson due to their substance abuse issues.

Critical reception

Contemporary reviews

Peace Sells... but Who's Buying? was well received by contemporary music critics. Billboard'''s critic Fred Goodman facetiously remarked that the album is an "array of impressive tracks" that he does not recommend for "the weak-hearted". Colin Larkin, writing in the Encyclopedia of Popular Music, viewed the album as a vast improvement over their previous record, from both technical and musical aspect. Kerrang! deemed Peace Sells... but Who's Buying? as the album that saw the inception of Megadeth's always-distinctive sound. Writing in The Rolling Stone Album Guide, author Nathan Brackett said that Megadeth were representing "the dark and nasty side" of American thrash throughout the 1980s. However, he considered the album to be almost identical to the rest of their discography from this period.

Legacy

In retrospect, Peace Sells... but Who's Buying? has been regarded as a milestone of the American thrash metal movement. Along with Metallica's Master of Puppets and Slayer's Reign in Blood, which were also released in 1986, Peace Sells... but Who's Buying? is considered pivotal in giving prominence to extreme metal. AllMusic's Steve Huey recognized the record as a notable achievement in the band's history, and called it a "classic of early thrash". Similarly, Chad Bowar of About.com said that the album captured Megadeth in their prime, and recommended it as a "mandatory" recording for the fans of this genre. Sputnikmusic's Mike Stagno named the album a "bona-fide masterpiece" and said it was the main reason why Megadeth became one of the leading acts of the underground scene. Joel McIver, writing in Record Collector, said that the album's main strength was its fluidity, with all songs moving in a continuous, steady stream. According to him, the album was "flip the bird" to the critics who were hostile to this type of music at the time.

Pitchfork Media's Jess Harvell said that thanks to this album, Megadeth developed a strong cult following. He viewed the record as a resistance against the glam metal acts from the day, because bands like Megadeth were more appealing to the "dead-end kids". Adrien Begrand of PopMatters praised the album for making strong impression both musically and visually. Although Begrand acknowledged that this was not Megadeth's most technically proficient album, he explained that the unique combination of "the extreme and the accessible" is why this album remained a fan-favorite. Spin magazine's Mike Powell cited the record as an example of "glossy hardcore" with Satanic lyricism. Jeff Treppel from Decibel noted that the album exhibits a distinctive sound, which set Megadeth apart from their contemporaries: "Peace Sells was a leaner, nastier predator. Megadeth preferred to kill with speed and precision instead of size and power." According to him, the album influenced countless heavy metal bands that followed, from Arch Enemy to DragonForce.

In addition to being critically acclaimed, the album received numerous accolades since its release. It has been featured in Robert Dimery's book 1001 Albums You Must Hear Before You Die, as well as in Martin Popoff's edition of the Top 500 Heavy Metal Albums of All Time. About.com ranked it third on their list of "Essential Thrash Metal Albums", commenting that more than two decades after its release, the record holds a status as an undisputed classic. In 2017, it was ranked 8th on Rolling Stone list of "100 Greatest Metal Albums of All Time".

Reissues
In 2003, Capitol Records re-released the album on DVD-Audio, with the original track list, in 96k/24-bit resolution for both surround and stereo mixes, and music videos for "Wake Up Dead" and "Peace Sells". The album was remixed and remastered in 2004 along with the rest of the band's Capitol Records albums. This reissue featured four alternate mixes of the album's songs as bonus tracks.

On July 12, 2011, the band re-released the album in both a 2-Disc reissue and a special 5-Disc + 3-LP box set, to commemorate the 25th anniversary of the album. The reissue features liner notes written by Mustaine and Metallica drummer Lars Ulrich. The 25th anniversary re-release sold approximately 2,000 units in its first week of release.

The 25th Anniversary edition box set features five discs. Discs 1–3 all feature the original album, with disc 1 having the original mix (remastered version from 2011), disc 2 featuring the 2004 remix, and disc 3 featuring the Randy Burns mixes (several examples of which appear as bonus tracks on the album's 2004 release). Disc 4 features the same 1987 show available on the 2-disc set. Disc five contains both the original album (again, remastered version from 2011), and the above listed 1987 show in hi-resolution audio. The 25th anniversary 2 CD edition features the original album on disc one and a previously unreleased 1987 concert on disc two.

Track listing

Personnel
Production and performance credits are adapted from the album liner notes.

Charts

Weekly charts

Year-end charts

Certifications

Accolades
Except where otherwise cited, all listed accolades attributed to Peace Sells... but Who's Buying?'' are adapted from Acclaimed Music.

References

Bibliography

External links

1986 albums
Combat Records albums
Albums with cover art by Ed Repka
Capitol Records albums
Megadeth albums